The silnyen is a Tibetan percussion instrument in the form of a cymbal with a small or no central boss.  The silnyen is struck by horizontal movement and is used in Buddhist rites.

See also
 Rolmo
 Tibetan music

References

Tibetan musical instruments
Cymbals